Charef is a town and commune in Djelfa Province, Algeria. According to the 1998 census it had a population of 19,373.

Language 
The most commonly spoken language is Arabic

References

Communes of Djelfa Province